A Bunch of Fives is an English children’s  television show from ATV, broadcast for two series of seven episodes each in 1977 and 1978 on ITV. A precursor of Grange Hill, it starred Andrew Rinous, Lesley Manville and Jamie Foreman as fifth formers who start a school newspaper. The show spawned one paperback tie-in.

The series was released on DVD by Network in May 2010.

References and notes

External links

1970s British children's television series
1977 British television series debuts
1978 British television series endings
ITV children's television shows
British teen drama television series
Television series about teenagers
Television series by ITV Studios
Television shows produced by Associated Television (ATV)
English-language television shows
Television shows shot at ATV Elstree Studios